John Wilby Morley (30 July 1838 – 24 April 1864) was an English first-class cricketer.

The son of The Reverend William Morley, he was born in July 1838 at Raithby, Lincolnshire. He was educated at Marlborough College, before going up to Brasenose College, Oxford. While studying at Oxford, he made four appearances in first-class cricket for Oxford University in 1859–60, scoring a total of 47 runs with a high score of 19. Shortly after graduating from Oxford, Morley emigrated to Australia, where he died along the Mackenzie River in Queensland in April 1864.

References

External links

1838 births
1864 deaths
People from East Lindsey District
People educated at Marlborough College
Alumni of Brasenose College, Oxford
English cricketers
Oxford University cricketers
English emigrants to colonial Australia